Tembo may refer to:

People
 Andrew Tembo (born 1971), Zambian football midfielder
 Asafu Tembo, Zambian judoka
 Biggie Tembo Jr. (born 1988), Zimbabwean musician 
 Bruce Tembo (born 1991), Zimbabwean cricketer
 Chris Tembo, Zambian football coach
 Christon Tembo (1944–2009), Zambian politician and army commander
 Dorothy Tembo (born 1961), is Zambian economist and trade and development expert
 Eddie Tembo (born 1980), Zambian-born Scottish shinty player
 Fwayo Tembo (born 1989), Zambian footballer
 John Tembo (born 1932), Malawian politician
 John Tembo Jr, Malawian diplomat
 Kaitano Tembo (born 1970), Zimbabwean football defender
 Kenias Tembo (born 1955), Zimbabwean long-distance runner
 Lazarus Tembo, Zambian singer
 Lily Tembo (1981–2009), Zambian musician, radio presenter, journalist and charity worker
 Martha Tembo (born 1998), Zambian footballer
 Nancy Tembo, Malawian politician
 Paul Tembo (died 6 July 2001), Zambian politician
 Roland tembo, character in Jurassik Park
 Stanley Tembo, Zambian footballer
 Vera Tembo (born 1953), Zambian politician
 Ziyo Tembo (born 1985), Zambian footballer

Places
 Bahia de Tembo, a beach in Oaxaca, Mexico
 Tembo-Aluma, a town in Malanje, Angola

Other
 Tembo (film),  1951 American documentary film
 A Bantu ethnic group in the Democratic Republic of the Congo
 Tembo, a palm wine in Tanzania and other countries (or sometimes just alcohol)
 Tembo language (disambiguation)
 Tembo the Badass Elephant, a 2015 video game
 , a beer of the Democratic Republic of the Congo

See also
 Tempo

Zambian surnames